Vuk Čelić (born 7 November 1996) is a Serbian swimmer. He competed in the men's 200 metre backstroke event at the 2017 World Aquatics Championships. He qualified to represent Serbia at the 2020 Summer Olympics in the men's 800 metre freestyle event.

References

External links
 
 

1996 births
Living people
Serbian male swimmers
Swimmers at the 2014 Summer Youth Olympics
Male backstroke swimmers
Swimmers at the 2020 Summer Olympics
Olympic swimmers of Serbia
20th-century Serbian people
21st-century Serbian people